Pat's Pizza is a chain of restaurants in Maine. The chain was started in 1931 when Carl D. "Pat" Farnsworth bought the ice cream store in Orono, Maine, in which he had worked as a high-schooler. In 1953, he added pizza to the menu, and it was such a hit that he changed Farnsworth's Cafe into a pizza parlor, giving it its current name. It eventually grew to 13 locations, covering the state. The original store was known as a "second home to generations of University of Maine students". In 1993, Pat reported that 250,000 pizzas a year were being sold from the Orono location alone. Pat Farnsworth died at the age of 90 in 2003.

References

External links
 
 
 

Pizza chains of the United States
Restaurants in Maine
Restaurants established in 1931
Orono, Maine
1931 establishments in Maine